The 2018 Winter Cup was an artistic gymnastics competition held at the Westgate Las Vegas in Las Vegas from February 15 to February 17, 2018.

Competition
The competition was the first to feature separate junior and senior competitive divisions. The finals session featured the top 28 senior athletes and the top 14 junior athletes. Junior athletes advanced to the finals according to the all-around ranking from the first day of competition. All-around ranking and individual event champions were determined via a combined two-day score. Performances at the Winter Cup helped determine the 12 men who comprised the United States men's national gymnastics team at the 2018 U.S. National Gymnastics Championships.

Medalists

References

U.S. Winter Cup
Gymnastics
Winter Cup
Winter Cup
Winter Cup